"My Love Is Your Love" is a song by American singer Whitney Houston. It was written and produced by Wyclef Jean and Jerry Duplessis for Houston’s fourth studio album of the same name (1998). Released on June 21, 1999, as the album's fourth single, it received positive reviews and was successful worldwide, hitting the top 10 in 23 international markets. The song peaked at number four on the US Billboard Hot 100, number two in the United Kingdom, and number one in New Zealand. It was later certified platinum by the Recording Industry Association of America (RIAA).

Along with the original mid-tempo reggae-influenced version that was produced by Wyclef Jean, a dance remixed version by Jonathan Peters was also released. A live version was included in the 2014 CD/DVD release, Whitney Houston Live: Her Greatest Performances. Duke Dumont interpolated the song in his song "I Got U".

Critical reception
Daily Record wrote, "A fantastic return to form and another great single from her latest album of the same name. This once again uses a hip-hop beat to perfectly capture Whitney's soaring vocals." They also stated that "this is the best track in years from the soul diva." Entertainment Weekly editor Mark Bautz praised the song, "Wyclef Jean's gorgeous reggae-tinged title song and three funky cuts by Rodney Jerkins showcase the 35-year-old Whitney Houston in all her creative, soulful maturity." Rolling Stone's Rob Sheffield praised the song as a one with some "creative juice"; "on the excellent title track, Wyclef gives Houston the sexiest Bob Marley rip-off he's ever written." USA Today editor Rachel D. called this track "a spiritual, reggae-tinged jam from Wyclef Jean."

Chart performance
"My Love Is Your Love" was the fourth single from Houston's 1998 album, My Love Is Your Love. It was a massive hit worldwide, becoming another one of Houston's signature songs. The single was released in each country of Europe from June 1999, prior to the United States. Upon release, the song was popular immediately across Europe and became a bigger hit during her European leg of My Love Is Your Love World Tour. On June 27, 1999, the single went straight to its peak position, number two, in the United Kingdom for the week ending date of July 3, 1999. According to The Official Charts Company, it has sold 525,000 copies there, becoming Britain's 22nd best-selling single of 1999. In Germany, it was also very successful. The single entered Media Control Top 100 Singles Chart at number 39, the week dated June 14, 1999, and three weeks later reached a peak of two, spending consecutive 15 weeks within the top 10 on the chart. It was certified Platinum by the Bundesverband Musikindustrie (BVMI) for shipments of 500,000 copies of the single. The song also reached the number two in countries such as Austria, Ireland, the Netherlands, Sweden, and Switzerland. It went to top five in Belgium (Flanders), Denmark, and Norway, and reached the top 10 on the singles charts in Belgium, Canada, and France. Eventually, the single topped the European Hot 100 Singles Chart for a week, becoming her fourth number one single on the chart and was positioned at number six in the Europe's Top Singles list of 1999. In New Zealand, it peaked at number one for a week, making it Houston's third number-one single in the country after 1987's "I Wanna Dance with Somebody (Who Loves Me)" and 1992's "I Will Always Love You."

Likewise, "My Love Is Your Love" was a big hit in the United States. The song debuted at number 81 on the Billboard Hot 100 chart, the issue dated September 4, 1999, without a retail release. With its official single in two weeks, it shot up on the chart and reached the top 10 in the next three weeks, the issue date of October 9, 1999, becoming her 22nd Hot 100 top-10 hit. On January 1, 2000, the single peaked at number four, making her the first artist to have a top-10 hit in the 1980s, 1990s and 2000s, staying within the top 10 of the chart for 17 weeks. It also reached the number two position on the Billboard Hot R&B/Hip-Hop Songs chart (formerly "Hot R&B Singles & Tracks"), the issue date of September 25, 1999, spending a total of 29 weeks on the chart, and topped Billboard Hot Dance Music/Club Play, making it Houston's eighth number-one song of the chart. The song also reached top 10 on the Billboard Pop Songs, become her final single on the chart. The single was certified Platinum by the Recording Industry Association of America for shipments of 1,000,000 copies on December 14, 1999. According to Nielsen SoundScan, it has sold 900,000 copies in the US alone.

Track listings

US 2× 12-inch vinyl single
A1. "My Love Is Your Love" (Jonathan Peters' Vocal Mix) ― 13:46 	
B1. "My Love Is Your Love" (Thunderpuss 2000 Severe Dub) ― 8:31
B2. "My Love Is Your Love" (Album Version) ― 4:24 	
C1. "My Love Is Your Love" (Thunderpuss 2000 Club Mix) ― 8:28 	
C2. "My Love Is Your Love" (Album Version) (Instrumental) ― 4:24 	
D1. "My Love Is Your Love" (Wyclef Remix) ― 4:10 	
D2. "My Love Is Your Love" (Salaam Remix) ― 4:11

 US maxi-CD single
 "My Love Is Your Love" (Wyclef Remix) ― 4:10 	
 "My Love Is Your Love" (Salaam Remix) ― 4:11 	
 "My Love Is Your Love" (Jonathan Peters' Radio Mix) ― 4:30 	
 "My Love Is Your Love" (Thunderpuss 2000 Radio Mix) ― 4:11 	
 "My Love Is Your Love" (Jonathan Peters' Vocal Club Mix) ― 13:46 	
 "My Love Is Your Love" (Thunderpuss 2000 Club Mix) ― 8:28 	
 "My Love Is Your Love" (Thunderpuss 2000 Severe Dub) ― 8:31
 "It's Not Right But It's Okay" (KCC's Release The Love Groove Mix) ― 7:05

 Australian maxi-CD single
 "My Love Is Your Love" (Album Version) ― 4:22 	
 "My Love Is Your Love" (Wyclef Remix) ― 4:19 	
 "It's Not Right But It's Okay" (KCC's Release The Love Groove Bootleg Mix) ― 7:03
 "My Love Is Your Love" (Thunderpuss 2000 Club Mix) ― 8:30 	
 "My Love Is Your Love" (Jonathan Peters' Vocal Club Mix) ― 13:48 	

 European maxi-CD single
 "My Love Is Your Love" (Radio Edit) ― 4:03
 "My Love Is Your Love" (Wyclef Mix) ― 4:23 	
 "My Love Is Your Love" (Salaam Remi Remix) ― 4:12 	
 "It's Not Right But It's Okay" (KCC's Release The Love Groove Bootleg Mix) ― 7:04 	

 European maxi-CD single (The Remixes)
 "My Love Is Your Love" (Radio Edit) ― 4:04
 "My Love Is Your Love" (Wyclef Mix Feat. Dyme) ― 4:22
 "My Love Is Your Love" (Jonathan Peters Tight Mix) ― 8:23
 "My Love Is Your Love" (Thunderpuss Radio Mix) ― 4:11
 "My Love Is Your Love" (Marvel & Eily South Side Mix) ― 7:14

 European CD single
 "My Love Is Your Love" (Radio Edit) ― 4:03
 "My Love Is Your Love" (Wyclef Mix) ― 4:23 	

 UK CD single
 "My Love Is Your Love" (Radio Edit) ― 4:03 	
 "My Love Is Your Love" (Wyclef Mix) ― 4:23 	
 "My Love Is Your Love" (Marvel & Eily Vocal Mix) ― 7:14

Personnel

Credits
Written and produced by W. Jean, J. Duplessis
Lead and background vocals: Whitney Houston
Choir: Eric Cherry's Family And Friends
Additional vocals: Robby Pardlo, Ryan Toby

Recording and mixing
Recorded and mixed by Rickie St. Hilaire at The Hit Factory

Charts

Weekly charts

Year-end charts

Decade-end charts

Certifications

Release history

See also
 List of European number-one hits of 1999
 List of number-one singles in 1999 (New Zealand)
 List of number-one dance singles of 1999 (U.S.)
 List of Billboard Hot 100 top 10 singles in 1999
 List of Billboard Hot 100 top 10 singles in 2000
 Billboard Year-End Hot 100 singles of 1999
 Billboard Year-End Hot 100 singles of 2000

References

External links
 My Love Is Your Love at Discogs

Whitney Houston songs
1990s ballads
1998 songs
1999 songs
1999 singles
American reggae songs
Arista Records singles
Bertelsmann Music Group singles
Contemporary R&B ballads
European Hot 100 Singles number-one singles
Reggae fusion songs
Song recordings produced by Jerry Duplessis
Song recordings produced by Wyclef Jean
Songs written by Jerry Duplessis
Songs written by Wyclef Jean
Soul ballads